A Brilliant Madness is a PBS American Experience documentary on the life of mathematician John Nash. It first aired April 28, 2002, and was produced by Randall MacLowry and directed by Mark Samels.

References

External links
 
 

American documentary films
American Experience
Documentary films about mathematics
2002 television films
2002 films
2000s American films